Neohorstia is a genus of mites in the family Acaridae.

Species
 Neohorstia mamillata Zachvatkin, 1941

References

Acaridae